LaFontaine Historic District is a national historic district located at La Fontaine, Wabash County, Indiana. It encompasses 56 contributing buildings and 4 contributing structures in the central business district and surrounding residential sections of La Fontaine.  It developed between about 1848 and 1930, and includes representative examples of Gothic Revival, Italianate, Queen Anne, Romanesque Revival, Classical Revival, and Bungalow / American Craftsman style architecture.

Notable buildings include the Matthews Service Station (c. 1915), John Finkenbiner Blacksmith Shop (c. 1885), Criswell House/Masonic Lodge (c. 1890), LaFontaine Methodist Church (1902), O. W. Clark Grocery (c. 1910), I.O.O.F. Hall (1905), Parker Building (1884), Parker House (1848, c. 1910), Parker Carriage House (c. 1850), Original Parker Store (c. 1850, c. 1885), Farmers State Bank (1919), and Knights of Pythias Lodge No. 211/LaFontaine National Bank (1893, 1918).

It was listed on the National Register of Historic Places in 2014.

References

Historic districts on the National Register of Historic Places in Indiana
Gothic Revival architecture in Indiana
Italianate architecture in Indiana
Romanesque Revival architecture in Indiana
Queen Anne architecture in Indiana
Neoclassical architecture in Indiana
Bungalow architecture in Indiana
Historic districts in Wabash County, Indiana
National Register of Historic Places in Wabash County, Indiana